Justina Ireland (born 7 February 1985) is an American science-fiction and fantasy author of young adult fiction and former editor-in-chief of the FIYAH Literary Magazine of Black Speculative Fiction. She received the 2018 World Fantasy Award for Non-Professional Work. Her novel Dread Nation won the 2019 Locus Award, and was nominated for the Andre Norton, Bram Stoker, and Lodestar Awards.

Biography 
As a teen, Ireland had aspirations to become a historian. She enlisted in the military at nineteen, where she would serve as an Arabic linguistics expert. Now based in York, Pennsylvania, she works for the U.S. Navy as a director of logistics and weapon-systems support, and teaches creative writing at York College of Pennsylvania, where she is an adjunct lecturer in the department of Communication and Writing.

Ireland holds a BA in History from Armstrong Atlantic State University and an MFA in Writing for Children and Young Adults from Hamline University, where she wrote a thesis on "microaggressions in children’s literature". She is currently pursuing her PhD in English Literature.

Writing 
Ireland is known for writing strong female characters, and for addressing issues of race, class, power, misogyny, sexism, and colorism in her fiction.

Dread Nation 
Her best-known novel, Dread Nation, is an alternate history set in 19th century U.S. In this timeline, the Civil War ends when zombies emerge from their graves at Gettysburg. The enslaved are then freed, but Black and Indigenous children are then trained to fight the undead and protect the nation. The main character, Jane McKeene, is a biracial teen sent to a prestigious combat school where she trains in hopes of being assigned to a wealthy white family.

Dread Nation received largely positive reviews that praised Ireland for her skillful approach to dealing with difficult issues related to slavery and its legacy. Kirkus Reviews wrote, "With a shrewd, scythe-wielding protagonist of color, Dread Nation is an exciting must-read." School Library Journal, in their review, stated, "Ireland skillfully works in the different forms of enslavement, mental and physical, into a complex and engaging story" and declared that the novel is "A perfect blend of horrors real and imagined". Alex Brown of Tor.com wrote, "Dread Nation is the perfect example of why we need more diversity in the YA author pool. Only a Black American woman could write Dread Nation."

Advocacy and activism 
Ireland is known as an outspoken advocate for diversifying YA literature. Lila Shapiro, in a 2018 article in New York magazine, called her "YA Twitter’s Leading Warrior." She has been vocal about the need for more authors of color, and stories that feature characters of color in YA literature.

Ireland is also the founder of Writing in the Margins, an organization that provides mentorship to writers from historically marginalized groups.

Bibliography

Standalone novels 
Vengeance Bound (2013; Simon & Schuster Books For Young Readers) – 
Promise of Shadows (2014; Simon & Schuster Books For Young Readers) –  
Scream Site (2018; Capstone Editions) – 
Ophie's Ghosts (2021; Balzer + Bray) – 
Rust in the Root (2022; Balzer + Bray) –

Dread Nation Series  
Dread Nation (2018; Balzer + Bray) –   
Deathless Divide (2020; Balzer + Bray) – 
Collection:

 Three for the Road (2020) – e-book
 "Dread South" (2017)
 "Letters from Home" (2018)
 "Dread Quarter" (2020)

Devils' Pass 
All published by Stone Arch Books unless otherwise noted

 Evie Allen vs. the Quiz Bowl Zombies (2017) – 
 Jeff Allen vs. the Time Suck Vampire (2017) – 
 Tiffany Donovan vs. the Cookie Elves of Destruction (2017) – 
 Zach Lopez vs. the Unicorns of Doom (2017) – 
 Tiffany Donovan vs. the Poison Werewolves (2018) – 
 Zach Lopez vs. the Shadow Cats (2018) –

Star Wars contributions 
All published by Disney Lucasfilm Press unless otherwise noted
Flight of the Falcon
1 Star Wars: Lando's Luck (2018) – 
Journey to Star Wars: The Rise of Skywalker
3 Spark of the Resistance (2019) – 
The High Republic:
A Test of Courage (2021) – 
Out of the Shadows (2021) – 
Mission to Disaster (2022) –

Contributions to anthologies

Awards and nominations

References

External links 
 Official author website
 Writing in the Margins official website

Living people
21st-century American novelists
American women novelists
American science fiction writers
21st-century American women writers
21st-century African-American women writers
21st-century African-American writers
1985 births